Naresh Roopnarine (born 15 December 1980) is a Guyanese cricketer. He played in one first-class match for Guyana in 2002/03.

See also
 List of Guyanese representative cricketers

References

External links
 

1980 births
Living people
Guyanese cricketers
Guyana cricketers